Jean-Frédéric de Turckheim (10 December 1780, in Strasbourg – 13 December 1850, in Paris) was a French politician.

He conducted a thwarted campaign for deputy, 27 February 1824, in the 4th electoral district of Bas-Rhin against Georges Humann, the banker and financier, he was elected in the Grand college in the same department.

Family
He was one of four sons of Bernard Turckheim and Lili Schönenmann: Jean-Frédéric, Jean-Charles, Frédéric-Guillaume and Henri.

His mother, Lili, (23 June 1758 at Frankfort1817) had been engaged to Johann Wolfgang von Goethe in 1775, but married Bernard Turckheim on 25 August 1778.

References

Mayors of Strasbourg
French people of German descent
1780 births
1850 deaths